Bairi Piya is an Indian television drama series that aired from 21 September 2009 to 3 September 2010 on Colors TV. It was produced by Ekta Kapoor and starred Sharad Kelkar (Thakur Digvijay Singh) and Supriya Kumari (Amoli).

Plot

Amoli is an optimistic and fearless 20-year-old girl and the eldest child of her parents. Amoli's friend, Kaumudi, is abducted by goons working for Thakur Digvijay, a rich landlord, because her father, Tukaram, is unable to pay his debts owed to him. Amoli fights the goons but is unable to save Kaumudi. Thakur Digvijay secretly keeps Kaumudi and spends the night with her. When she returns to her family, they do not accept her due to societal pressure, thus prompting her to leave the village. The incident upsets Amoli and aggravates her hatred toward Thakur. Thakur orders his goons to take over Tukaram's land at any cost, so they set fire to his crops. This breaks Tukaram's family. Amoli's mother, Suman, wants to poison the entire family because she does not want her children to die of hunger.

Amoli decides to visit Thakur's wife, Urmila, who is a soft and kind-hearted woman. She goes into their haveli while it rains. In the haveli, she takes shelter in a room to protect herself from the rain. While searching for Urmila, she runs into Thakur and he catches hold of her. Amoli pleads with Thakur to release her, but Thakur assures her that he is attracted to her. Later, he plots to get her but fails. His attraction towards her is such that he is willing to go to any lengths to get her. He then arranges for the marriage of his servant Radhe and Amoli. Post their marriage, he tries to impress her but fails again. Meanwhile, Amoli and her husband, Radhe fall in love, which irks Thakur, so he kills Radhe. Urmila leaves Thakur after learning of this and helps Amoli escape from the mansion; Amoli then takes an oath to punish Thakur and goes back to her parent's house. Suman is worried for her daughter because she knows Thakur will go to extreme lengths to get Amoli. For her daughter's safety, Suman tells Amoli to go to Meerut to see a family that will help her. Amoli is confused but goes to Meerut to escape from Thakur.

Upon reaching Meerut, Amoli enters the mansion of the Pundirs, a very rich and influential family. The family consists of Devi Pundir, his wife Sunanda, their two daughters Sanchita and Ankita, two nephews Deepak and Prithvi, their two wives Badiya and Chiggy, and Devi's sister and brother-in-law. Amoli meets Sunanda first but she mistakes her for a servant. Amoli agrees to live in the Pundir mansion as a maid where she forms a friendship with Ankita. Meanwhile, Thakur searches for Amoli everywhere and will not rest until he finds her. Suman visits the Pundir mansion to warn Amoli that Thakur is searching all the nearby towns and cities for her, but she is shocked to see Amoli working as a maid since that is not the purpose of Amoli's trip. She confronts Sunanda about Amoli, but Sunanda is shocked to see Suman as they share some emotional baggage from the past. Suman reveals to Sunanda that Amoli is not her daughter but Sunanda's. It is revealed that 20 years ago, Sunanda gave birth to Amoli and Suman met her and helped her as Sunanda was in pain. As soon as Amoli was born, Sunanda's mother tells Suman that she wanted a grandson and not a granddaughter, and thus tells her to keep Amoli as her own; Sunanda was informed that her baby died upon birth. In the present, Sunanda has a breakdown upon learning that her eldest daughter had been alive all these years and is now working as her maid. Suman tells Sunanda to tell her husband that Amoli is his daughter, but Sunanda decides not to as it will ruin the family. After this, Sunanda treats Amoli as her daughter which surprises Badiya, who dislikes Amoli. Amoli soon finds out that Sunanda is her biological mother, which she disapproves of at first, but later comes around.

Badiya and Devi find out about this secret and plot to reveal the same to the whole family. They decide to do so on Devi and Sunanda's marriage anniversary. Badiya calls Suman back and Suman is shocked to see that Sunanda still has not told the family members about Amoli's real identity. She lashes out at Sunanda due to her poor treatment of Amoli. She reveals to the whole family that they are Amoli's biological family. The family members are stunned, especially Devi, Sanchita, and Ankita. Devi is angry at Sunanda and threatens to end their marriage. Upon hearing this, Sunanda runs away and meets with an accident. The family visits her in the hospital and there, Devi accepts Amoli as his daughter and Sanchita and Ankita accept her as their sister. A few days later, Sunanda returns to the mansion with Devi and she is happy to see Amoli bonding with the family.

However, a man named Ranveer enters Pundir mansion and looks exactly like Thakur. Amoli accuses him of being Thakur, but Ranveer is adamant that he is Ranveer and not Thakur. Ranveer turns out Devi's business partner, who is staying at the Pundir mansion for a few days. After a while, Amoli and Ranveer become friends as she now believes him to be Ranveer. However, Ranveer is, in fact, Thakur; he created a fake identity for Ranveer in order to get Amoli back. The family chooses a boy for Ankita and begins the wedding preparations. But the aunt of Ankita's would-be in-laws tells the family that, since Amoli is the eldest, she should get married prior to Ankita. She sees Ranveer and Amoli's photograph and believes them to be in love. Amoli agrees to marry him for her family and Ankita's happiness.

After the marriage, Amoli finds out that he is Thakur and runs away. He later decides to stay to get revenge. Soon, she sends him to jail twice despite him being innocent, but he gets bailed out both times. Thakur's nephew, Puneet poisons Amoli's drink out of revenge. Thakur sees the poison in Amoli's drink and drinks it himself. After this incident, Amoli feels a change of heart towards Thakur, as now she knows that he is willing to die for her. However, Amoli makes a few more attempts to take revenge on Thakur, but fails each time. She then runs over a woman and Thakur takes the blame for it. Incidents like these bring them closer. Amoli then falls in love with Thakur. Amoli's love changes Thakur and he starts doing things that Amoli likes. After another incident, Puneet orders Amoli to be stoned to death, but he is stoned instead. Later, a man revealed to be Radhe, is shown burning the photo of Thakur and Amoli.

Radhe has returned to get revenge on both Thakur and Amoli. Amoli is extremely happy to find out that he is alive. Radhe pretends to still be in love with her but he is actually in love with Sandhya. Both of their plot to steal Thakur and Amoli's property. Thakur finds out about this and informs Amoli but she accuses him back instead. However, she herself finds out the truth and feels betrayed. Amoli and Thakur are kidnapped by Puneet and Radhe. While Thakur fights back, Puneet tries to kill him. To save Thakur, Amoli shoots Puneet and he dies and Thakur takes the blame upon himself. Amoli cries upon seeing Thakur being arrested by the police. Thakur promises Amoli that he will return to her. He is sentenced to five-year imprisonment. Upon his release from prison, Thakur returns home. The villagers give a great welcome to their Thakur. Thakur and Amoli finally consummate their marriage and start a happy life, dealing with village problems together.

Cast

Main cast
 Sharad Kelkar as Thakur Digvijay Singh Bhadoria/Ranveer, Amoli's husband, Badi Malkin's son, Suren, Chandana and Puneet's uncle
 Supriya Kumari as Amoli Digvijay Singh, Thakur's wife, Harshvardhan and Sunanda Devi's eldest daughter, Sanchita and Ankita's eldest sister, Tukaram & Sudan's step-daughter

Recurring cast
 Shresth Kumar as Radhe, Amoli's ex-husband 
 Shreya Bugade as Chandana, Radhe's second wife 
 Sumana Das as Kajri
 Deepak Sandhu as Deepesh Bhadoria, Thakur's nephew
 Asima Bhatt as Badi Malkin, Thakur's mother
 Kadambari Shantshree Suman Kamble, Amoli's adoptive mother, Dhani's mother
 Kailash as Tukaram Kamble, Amoli's adoptive father, Dhani's father
 Kumar Hegde as Dhani Kamble, Amoli's adoptive sister, Suman and Tukaram's daughter 
 Vaishnavi Mahant as Sunanda Devi Pundir, Amoli's biological mother, Devi's wife, Sanchita and Ankita's mother 
Manoj Bhaskar as Harshvardhan “Devi” Pundir, Amoli's biological father, Sunanda's husband, Sanchita and Ankita's father
Neetha Shetty as Surbhi Pundir (Badiya Bahu), Amoli's cousin in law, Nirbhay's wife
Sandhya Soni as Ankita Pundir, Amoli's biological sister, Sanchita's sister, Sunanda and Devi's youngest daughter
Neha Gehlot as Sanchita Pundir, Amoli's biological sister, Ankita's sister, Sunanda and Devi's second  daughter 
Pallavi Subhash Chandran as Rashmi Pundir (Chiggy Bahu), Amoli's cousin in law, Prithvi's wife
Pawan Chopra as Viraat Pundir, Amoli's biological uncle, Devi's elder brother, Nirbhay and Prithvi's father
Kanika Chaddar as Rohini Pundir, Amoli's biological aunt, Viraat's wife, Nirbhay and Prithvi's mother
Priyamvada Kant as Kaumudi, Amoli's best friend
Rithvik Dhanjani as Prithvi Pundir, Amoli's biological cousin brother, Devi's nephew, Rashmi's husband 
Aham Sharma Nirbhay Pundir, Amoli's biological cousin brother, Devi's nephew, Surbhi's husband
Shubhi Mehta as Urmila Bhadoria, Thakur's ex-wife
Srishty Rode as Saumya
Mahhi Vij as Nakusha

References

Balaji Telefilms television series
Colors TV original programming
2009 Indian television series debuts
2010 Indian television series endings
Hindi-language television shows